The siege of Skardu was a prolonged military blockade carried out by the Gilgit Scouts, Chitral Scouts and Chitral State Bodyguards, acting in coordination against Jammu and Kashmir State Forces and the Indian Army in the town of Skardu, during the First Kashmir War of 1947.

Background
Gilgit Scouts, the British-officered force of the princely state of Jammu and Kashmir stationed in Gilgit for frontier defence, revolted  on 31 October 194 after hearing the news of Jammu and Kashmir's accession to India. They were joined by rebels from the 6th battalion of the Jammu and Kashmir State Forces stationed at Bunji, annihilated the rest of the battalion and imprisoned its commander Col. Abdul Majid. The combined forces of the Gilgit Scouts and rebels were placed under the command of Lt. Col. Aslam Khan by the Azad Kashmir provisional government. Aslam Khan divided the troops into three forces of 400 men each, and deployed one of them, the "Ibex Force" under Major Ehsan Khan, to take Skardu.

Skardu, the political centre of Baltistan, was the headquarters of a tehsil of the Ladakh wazarat, The administration of the wazarat was stationed at Skardu for six months in each year and at Leh for the other six months. At the time of the rebellion, the governor of the wazarat was at Skardu and a company of the 6th battalion under the command of Major Sher Jung Thapa, was at Leh.

Siege of Skardu 
When the news of the Gilgit rebellion was received, Sher Jung Thapa was promoted to Lieut. Colonel and made commander of the remainder of the 6th battalion. He was asked to proceed to Skardu for its defence. On reaching Skardu on 3 December, he realised that his position was untenable and sought permission to withdraw the garrison and the civil administration to Kargil and also requested reinforcements. The request for withdrawal was turned down and he was asked "to hold to last man and last round". The Indian forces, along with the non-Muslim civil population of Skardu, withdrew into the Skardu Fort where they were besieged by the Ibex Force. Thus began the defence of Skardu.

Meanwhile, Srinagar, under the control of the Indian Army, assembled 3 successive Skardu relief columns, but they were not successful in reaching Skardu. With Gilgit under Pakistan's control and absence of any effective relief, including air dropping of ammunition, it was a matter of time before the end neared. On 11 February 1948, the Pakistani forces battled with the Skardu garrison of the fort. After a six-hour-long battle between the two, the attackers retreated. They came again on 14 February directing "harassing fire into the fort".

By mid-August 1948, the Skardu garrison was in beggarly shape and the Kashmir forces left the fort in small batches on 13 August 1948. On 14 August 1948, outnumbered five to one, and with the last box of the reserve ammunition used, the garrison surrendered. All the remaining men were reportedly killed by the invaders, except for Col. Thapa and his Sikh orderly, who were taken prisoner. Skardu became part of the Pakistan-controlled Kashmir, eventually renamed Gilgit-Baltistan.

Notes

References

Indo-Pakistani War of 1947–1948
History of Gilgit-Baltistan
Jammu and Kashmir State Forces